The Texaco Station No. 1 is a historic automotive service station at 110 East Main Street in Paragould, Arkansas.  Built in 1925, it is a Mission-style brick building with a canopy extending to cover the service area.  It is one of only two surviving early gas stations in the city, and was used as a service station until about 1970, going through a number of ownership and fuel supplier changes.  In 1985 it was converted into the Hamburger Station, a restaurant.

The station was listed on the National Register of Historic Places in 2001.

See also
National Register of Historic Places listings in Greene County, Arkansas

References

Gas stations on the National Register of Historic Places in Arkansas
Mission Revival architecture in Arkansas
Commercial buildings completed in 1924
Buildings and structures in Paragould, Arkansas
National Register of Historic Places in Greene County, Arkansas
1924 establishments in Arkansas
Texaco